The Gulf of Chania is an embayment of the Sea of Crete in the northwestern region of the island of Crete in present-day Greece. One headland forming the Gulf of Chania is the promontory known as the Akrotiri Peninsula.

Ancient history
In prehistory the powerful city of Kydonia commanded the Gulf of Chania and was a center of early Cretan art and culture in western Crete. By 74 BC the city-state of Kydonia fended off an attack by Rome in a naval battle in the Gulf of Chania.

See also
Britomartis

Line notes

References
 Chania during antiquity
 C. Michael Hogan, Cydonia, The Modern Antiquarian, Jan. 23, 2008
 Robert Lambert Playfair (1892) Handbook to the Mediterranean: Its Cities, Coasts and Islands, J. Murray publisher

Gulfs of Greece
Gulfs of the Aegean Sea
Landforms of Chania (regional unit)
Landforms of Crete